Narayan Ram Das is an Indian politician and member of the Bharatiya Janata Party. Das was a member of the Uttarakhand Legislative Assembly from the Bageshwar constituency in Bageshwar district. He was minister of state for Uttaranchal Development in Kalyan Singh cabinet from September 1997 to November 1999.

References 

People from Bageshwar district
Bharatiya Janata Party politicians from Uttarakhand
Members of the Uttarakhand Legislative Assembly
Living people
21st-century Indian politicians
Year of birth missing (living people)